Cornwells Heights station is a train station in Cornwells Heights, Pennsylvania. Located on Station Avenue near Bristol Pike in Bensalem Township, it serves the northeast suburbs of Philadelphia. It is served by SEPTA's Trenton Line commuter trains. On weekdays only, a limited number of Amtrak Keystone Service trains also stop at the station. 

In 2017, Cornwells Heights saw 1,505 boardings on an average weekday, making it the busiest station outside of Center City. The station has a waiting room and a large park and ride facility, with direct access to and from Interstate 95 and Pennsylvania Route 63. The parking lot was built by PennDOT in anticipation of construction on I-95 and opened in 1997. It has 1,600 parking spaces, making it by far the largest parking lot in the SEPTA system.

Station layout

References

External links

SEPTA – Cornwells Heights Station
Cornwells Heights Amtrak & SEPTA Station (USA RailGuide – TrainWeb)

SEPTA Regional Rail stations
Former Pennsylvania Railroad stations
Amtrak stations in Pennsylvania
Railway stations in Bucks County, Pennsylvania
Stations on the Northeast Corridor